Malaysia competed in the 1978 Commonwealth Games held in Edmonton, Alberta, Canada from 3 to 12 August 1978.

Medal summary

Medals by sport

Medallists

Athletics

Men
Track and road events

Field event

Women
Track events

Key
Note–Ranks given for track events are within the athlete's heat only
Q = Qualified for the next round
q = Qualified for the next round as a fastest loser or, in field events, by position without achieving the qualifying target
NR = National record
N/A = Round not applicable for the event
Bye = Athlete not required to compete in round

Badminton

Shooting

Men

Swimming

Women

Weightlifting

Men

References

Malaysia at the Commonwealth Games
1978 in Malaysian sport
Nations at the 1978 Commonwealth Games